Washington is a male given name and a surname. It most frequently refers to George Washington (1732–1799), the first president of the United States of America.

Origin and dissemination

The name itself is a name of origin and refers to place names in England, such as Washington, Tyne and Wear, from which the ancestors of George Washington are said to have come.

The word became a surname in 1183 when William de Hertburn took the name William de Wassyngtona. In 1657 the name came to Virginia; from 1789 to 1797 George Washington was president.  Since this time the given name spread throughout the US as patriotic. In addition to a genealogical origin of the name, it is also (as with Abraham Lincoln and other persons associated with abolition of slavery in America) a favored assumed name of freed slaves and thus a widely spread surname of their progeny in the black population of the US.

Washington as a male given name is derived from the surname. It is particularly popular in the United States and South America, evoking the memory of George Washington.

Family name

George Washington (1732–1799), American general and statesman; first president of the United States (1789–1797)
George Washington (name), homonyms
Adolphus Washington (born 1994), American football player
Ar'Darius Washington (born 1999), American football player
Arthur Lee Washington Jr. (born 1949), American fugitive
Augustine Washington (1694–1743), Virginian planter, father of George Washington
Booker T. Washington (1856–1915), American civil rights leader, educator and author
Broderick Washington Jr. (born 1997), American football player
Bryce Washington (born 1996), American basketball player for Hapoel Galil Elyon of the Israeli Basketball Premier League
Bushrod Washington (1762–1829), American judge
Charles Washington (disambiguation), multiple people
Claudell Washington (1954–2020), American baseball player
Conor Washington (born 1992), Northern Irish footballer
Craig Anthony Washington (born 1941), American politician
Cullen Washington, Jr. (born 1972) American abstract painter.
Daryl Washington (born 1986), American football player
Dennis Washington (born 1934), American businessman
Denzel Washington (born 1954), American actor
Dinah Washington (1924–1963), American singer
Eric Washington (disambiguation), multiple people
Fredi Washington (1903–1994), American actress
Geno Washington (born 1943), American singer 
Grover Washington Jr. (1943–1999), American jazz saxophonist
Haleigh Washington (born 1995), American Olympic volleyball player
Harold Washington (1922–1987), American politician
Henry Stephens Washington (1867–1934), American geologist
Herb Washington (born 1951), American sprinter and baseball player
Isaiah Washington (born 1963), American actor
Jack Washington (1910–1964), American jazz saxophonist
James Washington (wide receiver) (born 1996), American football player
Jay Washington (born 1981), Filipino-American basketball player
Joe Washington (born 1953), American football player
John David Washington (born 1984), American football player
John P. Washington (1908–1943), Roman Catholic priest and lieutenant in the US Army
John Washington (disambiguation)
Justine Washington (born 1940), American singer
Kamasi Washington (born 1981), American jazz saxophonist
Keith Washington (born 1960), American singer
Kelley Washington (born 1979), American football player
Kenny Washington (basketball), American basketball player and coach
Kermit Washington (born 1951), American basketball player
Kerry Washington (born 1977), American actress
Lawrence Washington (1602–1652), English rector, great-great-grandfather of George Washington
Lawrence Washington (1659–1698), Virginian planter, grandfather of George Washington
Lawrence Washington (1718–1752), Virginian soldier, half-brother of George Washington
L'Damian Washington (born 1991), American football player
Leona Ford Washington (1928–2007), Texas community activist
Lorenzo Washington (1986–2021), American football player
Lucy Hall Washington (1835–1913), American poet and social reformer
Lynneice Washington, American lawyer and district attorney
Martha Washington (1731–1802), American first lady, wife of George Washington
MaliVai Washington (born 1969), American tennis player
Mashona Washington (born 1976), American tennis player
McKinley Washington Jr. (1936-2022), American minister and politician
Montrell Washington (born 1999), American football player
Patrice Washington (born 1961), Bahamian airplane pilot
P. J. Washington (born 1998), American basketball player
Megan Washington (born 1986), Australian singer-songwriter
Ned Washington (1901–1976), American lyricist
Richard Washington (born 1955), American basketball player
Rico Washington (born 1978), American baseball player
Ron Washington (born 1952), American baseball manager and player
Sabrina Washington (born 1978), British singer-songwriter
Sydney Magruder Washington, American ballet dancer
Taylor Washington, American soccer player
Tyree Washington (born 1976), American sprinter
TyTy Washington (born 2001), American basketball player
U L Washington (born 1953), American baseball player 
Walter Washington (1915–2003), American politician
William Washington (1752–1810), American soldier
William D. Washington (1833–1870), American painter
William Henry Washington (1813–1860), American politician

Given name
Washington Abdala (born 1959), Uruguayan politician
Washington Sebastián Abreu (born 1976), Uruguayan football player
Washington Adams (1814–1883), justice of the Supreme Court of Missouri
Washington Bartlett (1824–1887), American politician
Washington Beltrán Barbat (1885–1920), Uruguayan politician
Washington Beltrán (1914–2003), Uruguayan politician, son of the former
Washington Benavides (born 1930), Uruguayan poet and musician
Washington Bushnell (1825–1885), American politician
Washington Stecanela Cerqueira (born 1975), Brazilian football player
Washington Duke (1820–1905), American industrialist
Washington Irving (1783–1859), American author
Washington Luís (1869–1957), the 13th President of Brazil
Washington Muzzy (1828-1898), American farmer and politician
Washington Olivera (born 1954), Uruguayan coach and former footballer
Washington Roebling (1837–1926), American civil engineer 
Washington César Santos (1960–2014), Brazilian football player
Washington Silva (disambiguation), several people
Washington Sundar (born 1999), Indian cricketer
Washington Tais (born 1972), Uruguayan footballer

See also
Washington (disambiguation), other meanings including place names (in modern times, mostly named after George Washington)
All pages beginning with Washington

References

Masculine given names
English-language surnames
English toponymic surnames